The 1938 U.S. National Championships (now known as the US Open) was a tennis tournament that took place on the outdoor grass courts at the West Side Tennis Club, Forest Hills in New York City, United States. The tournament was scheduled to be held from Thursday 8 September until Saturday 17 September but was prolonged until Saturday 24 September due to poor weather caused by the 1938 New England hurricane. It was the 58th staging of the U.S. National Championships and the fourth Grand Slam tennis event of the year.

American Don Budge won the men's singles title and became the first tennis player to win the Grand Slam i.e. winning all four Major tennis tournaments (Australian Championships, French Championships, Wimbledon Championships, and U.S. National Championships) in a single calendar year. Budge also won the doubles and mixed doubles title.

Finals

Men's singles

 Don Budge defeated   Gene Mako  6–3, 6–8, 6–2, 6–1

Women's singles

 Alice Marble defeated  Nancye Wynne Bolton  6–0, 6–3

Men's doubles
 Don Budge /  Gene Mako defeated  Adrian Quist /  John Bromwich 6–3, 6–2, 6–1

Women's doubles
 Sarah Palfrey Cooke /  Alice Marble defeated  Simonne Mathieu /  Jadwiga Jędrzejowska 6–8, 6–4, 6–3

Mixed doubles
 Alice Marble /  Don Budge defeated  Thelma Coyne Long /  John Bromwich 6–1, 6–2

Notes

References

External links
Official US Open website

 
U.S. National Championships
U.S. National Championships (tennis) by year
U.S. National Championships
U.S. National Championships
U.S. National Championships
U.S. National Championships
U.S. National Championships
Sports competitions in Boston
Sports competitions in New York City
Tennis in Massachusetts
Tennis tournaments in New York (state)